Yves Mirande (Bagneux (Maine-et-Loire), May 8, 1876 – Paris, March 17, 1957) was a French screenwriter, director, actor, and producer.

Career 
Yves Mirande began his acting career in the theater, transitioning to movies in the silent era.

Filmography
 She Wolves, directed by Maurice Elvey (Silent, 1925, based on the play Un homme en habit) 
 Evening Clothes, directed by Luther Reed (Silent, 1927, based on the play Un homme en habit) 
 The Porter from Maxim's, directed by Roger Lion and Nicolas Rimsky (Silent, 1927, based on the play Le Chasseur de chez Maxim's) 
 , directed by Robert Boudrioz (Silent, 1929, based on the operetta Trois jeunes filles nues) 
 Kiss Me, directed by Robert Péguy (Silent, 1929, based on the play Embrassez-moi) 
 The Wonderful Day, directed by René Barberis (Silent, 1929, based on the play La Merveilleuse Journée) 
 L'Arpète, directed by Émile-Bernard Donatien (Silent, 1929, based on the play L'Arpète) 
 A Hole in the Wall, directed by René Barberis (French, 1930, based on the play Le Trou dans le mur) 
** , directed by Edvin Adolphson (Swedish, 1930, based on the play Le Trou dans le mur) 
** A Lucky Man, directed by Benito Perojo (Spanish, 1930, based on the play Le Trou dans le mur) 
 The Matrimonial Bed, directed by Michael Curtiz (English, 1930, based on the play Au premier de ces messieurs) 
 The Man in Evening Clothes, directed by René Guissart (French, 1931, based on the play Un homme en habit) 
** A Gentleman in Tails, directed by Roger Capellani and Carlos San Martín (Spanish, 1931, based on the play Un homme en habit) 

 Pour vivre heureux, directed by Claudio de la Torre (French, 1932, based on the play Pour vivre heureux)
 Simone est comme ça, directed by Karl Anton (French, 1932, based on the play Simone est comme ça)
 Kiss Me, directed by Léon Mathot (French, 1932, based on the play Embrassez-moi) 
 Mon cœur balance, directed by René Guissart (French, 1932, based on the play Une femme dans un lit) 
 The Wonderful Day, directed by Yves Mirande and Robert Wyler (French, 1932, based on the play La Merveilleuse Journée) 
 The Porter from Maxim's, directed by Karl Anton (French, 1933, based on the play Le Chasseur de chez Maxim's) 
 , directed by René Guissart (French, 1933, based on the play La Femme de mon ami) 

 Un Petit Trou pas cher, directed by Pierre-Jean Ducis (French, 1934, based on the play Un petit trou pas cher)
 Mr. What's-His-Name?, directed by Ralph Ince (English, 1935, based on the play Au premier de ces messieurs) 
 It Happened in Paris, directed by Carol Reed and Robert Wyler (English, 1935, based on the play L'Arpète) 
 The Porter from Maxim's, directed by Maurice Cammage (French, 1939, based on the play Le Chasseur de chez Maxim's) 
 Kisses for Breakfast, directed by Lewis Seiler (English, 1941, based on the play Au premier de ces messieurs) 
 A Hole in the Wall, directed by Émile Couzinet (French, 1950, based on the play Le Trou dans le mur) 
 , directed by Émile Couzinet (French, 1951, based on the play La Grande vie) 
 The Porter from Maxim's, directed by Henri Diamant-Berger (French, 1953, based on the play Le Chasseur de chez Maxim's) 
 , directed by Émile Couzinet (French, 1953, based on the play Une femme dans un lit) 
 The Porter from Maxim's, directed by Claude Vital (French, 1976, based on the play Le Chasseur de chez Maxim's) 
 The Wonderful Day, directed by Claude Vital (French, 1980, based on the play La Merveilleuse Journée)

As screenwriter

 1909 : Octave (Short film) 
 1909 : Le Petit qui a faim (Short film) 
 1910 : La Tournée des grands ducs (Short film) 
 1916 : The Gold Chignon 
 1930 :  
 1930 :  
 1930 :  
 1931 : Le Père célibataire 
 1931 : Révolte dans la prison 
 1931 :  
 1932 : You Will Be a Duchess 
 1932 : A Father Without Knowing It 
 1932 : Tumultes 
 1932 :  (Short film)
 1932 : La Perle 
 1933 : Charlemagne 
 1934 : Le Roi des Champs-Élysées 
 1934 :  
 1935 :  
 1935 : Quelle drôle de gosse! 
 1935 :  
 1935 : Man of the Moment 
 1935 : Princesse Tam-Tam 
 1935 : Baccara 
 1936 : Excursion Train 
 1936 :  
 1936 : Seven Men, One Woman 
 1936 :  
 1936 :  
 1936 : Ménilmontant 
 1936 : Tout va très bien madame la marquise 
 1937 :  
 1937 :  
 1937 : Life Dances On 
 1938 : Sweet Devil 
 1938 :  
 1938 : La Présidente 
 1938 : Café de Paris 
 1939 : Extenuating Circumstances 
 1939 : L'Esprit de Sidi-Brahim 
 1940 : Paris-New York 
 1940 : They Were Twelve Women 
 1940 : Moulin-Rouge 
 1941 :  
 1941 : The Acrobat 
 1941 : Strange Suzy  
 1941 :  
 1942 :  
 1942 : Soyez les bienvenus 
 1942 : At Your Command, Madame 
 1942 : The Benefactor 
 1942 :  
 1943 :  
 1943 :  
 1945 : St. Val's Mystery 
 1947 :  
 1949 : The Ladies in the Green Hats 
 1949 : Cage of Girls 
 1950 : The Bread Peddler 
 1954 : It's the Paris Life 
 1954 : The Two Orphans

Director
 1932 : The Wonderful Day
 1935 : Baccara
 1936 : Seven Men, One Woman 
 1936 :  
 1936 : The Bureaucrats 
 1937 :  
 1938 : Café de Paris 
 1939 : Behind the Facade 
 1940 : Paris-New York 
 1940 : Moulin-Rouge

Actor
 1933 : The Porter from Maxim's by Karl Anton
 1939 : Behind the Facade by Georges Lacombe and Yves Mirande, as Le clochard sur le banc
 1942 :  by Raymond Leboursier, as Brignolles

Producer
 1933 :

Theatre work

Author
 1909 : Un petit trou pas cher (with Henri Caen), Comédie-Royale
 1909 : Ma gosse' (with Henri Caen)
 1910 : Les Jeux sont faits? (with Guillaume Wolff), Théâtre Michel
 1912 : Pour vivre heureux (with André Rivoire), Théâtre de la Renaissance
 1920 : Un homme en habit (with ), Théâtre des Variétés
 1920 : La Femme de mon ami (with Henri Géroule), Théâtre Michel
 1920 :  (with Gustave Quinson), Théâtre du Palais-Royal
 1921 : Simone est comme ça (with Alexis Madis), Théâtre des Capucines
 1922 : La Merveilleuse Journée (with Gustave Quinson), Théâtre du Palais-Royal
 1922 : Pourquoi m'as-tu fait ça? (with Alexis Madis and Gustave Quinson), Théâtre des Capucines
 1923 : Embrassez-moi (with Tristan Bernard and Gustave Quinson), Théâtre du Palais-Royal
 1925 :  (with Raoul Moretti and Albert Willemetz), Théâtre des Bouffes-Parisiens
 1925 : Voulez-vous être ma femme? (by Jacques Richepin, adaptation by Yves Mirande), Théâtre de la Renaissance
 1926 : Au premier de ces messieurs (with André Mouëzy-Éon), Théâtre du Palais-Royal
 1927 : Une femme dans un lit (with Gustave Quinson), Théâtre du Palais-Royal
 1927 : L'Arpète (with Gustave Quinson), Théâtre La Scala
 1929 : Le Trou dans le mur, Théâtre de la Michodière
 1929 : La Grande vie (with Henri Géroule), Théâtre du Palais-Royal
 1946 : Ce soir je suis garçon! (with André Mouëzy-Éon), Théâtre Antoine

Comedian
 1943 : À la gloire d'Antoine by Sacha Guitry, Théâtre Antoine

Scenographer
 1949 : Le Petit'' by Tristan Bernard, Théâtre Antoine

References

1876 births
1957 deaths
French male screenwriters
20th-century French screenwriters
French film directors
French male film actors
French film producers
20th-century French male actors
20th-century French dramatists and playwrights
20th-century French male writers